Paul Eli Margulies (1935–2014) was an American writer, philosopher and advertising-industry creative director. Margulies was famous for writing jingles ("Plop, Plop, Fizz, Fizz, Oh What a Relief it Is!") and inventing tag lines such as I Can't Believe I Ate the Whole Thing. A graduate of Dartmouth, with a degree in philosophy, Margulies retired at an early age to write about philosophy.

Margulies was the son of Henrietta (née Greenspan) and Irving Margulies. Although famous on Madison Avenue for his innovative work in advertising, Margulies was best known, at the time of his death, as the father of actress Julianna Margulies.

References

 

American advertising executives
Dartmouth College alumni
1935 births
2014 deaths